The Sichuan frog (Rana shuchinae) is a species of frog in the family Ranidae found in China and possibly Myanmar. Its natural habitats are temperate shrubland, temperate grassland, rivers, intermittent rivers, swamps, freshwater marshes, and intermittent freshwater marshes.

It is found in Zhaojue County in southwestern Sichuan province, and Gongshan, Zhongdian and Deqin counties in northwestern Yunnan province.

References

Rana (genus)
Taxonomy articles created by Polbot
Amphibians described in 1950